The 1991 Norwich City Council election took place on 2 May 1991 to elect members of Norwich City Council in England. This was on the same day as other local elections. 16 of 48 seats (one-third) were up for election, with one additional seat up due to a by-election in Catton Grove ward.

Result summary

Ward results

Bowthorpe

Catton Grove

Coslany

Crome

Eaton

Heigham

Henderson

Lakenham

Mancroft

Mile Cross

Mousehold

Nelson

St. Stephen

Thorpe Hamlet

Town Close

University

References

1991 English local elections
1991
May 1991 events in the United Kingdom